Shemysheyka is an urban locality (an urban-type settlement) in Shemysheysky District of Penza Oblast, Russia. Population:

References

Urban-type settlements in Penza Oblast
Kuznetsky Uyezd (Saratov Governorate)